The 2008 European Men's and Women's Team Badminton Championships was held in Almere, the Netherlands, from February 12 to February 17, 2008, and was organised by the Badminton Europe and the Nederlandse Badminton Bond.

The tournament was double as 2008 Thomas Cup and Uber Cup qualification tournament, where the top three teams for each competitions qualified automatically.

Medalists

Men's team

Final stage

Final

Women's team

Final stage

Final

External links
Official Site 
Badminton Europe: 2008 European Men's and Women's Team Championships
Tournamentsoftware: European Men's & Women's Team Championships 2008

European Men's and Women's Team Badminton Championships
European Men's and Women's Team Badminton Championships
Badminton tournaments in the Netherlands
2008 in Dutch sport
International sports competitions hosted by the Netherlands
Sports competitions in Almere